The 1984 Virginia Slims World Championship Series was the 14th season since the foundation of the Women's Tennis Association. It commenced in March 1984, and concluded in March 1985 after  events.

The Virginia Slims World Championship Series was the elite tour for professional women's tennis organised by the Women's Tennis Association (WTA). It was held in place of the WTA Tour from 1983 until 1987 and featured tournaments that had previously been part of the Toyota Series and the Avon Series. It included the four Grand Slam tournaments and a series of other events. ITF tournaments were not part of the tour, although they awarded points for the WTA World Ranking.

Schedule
The table below shows the 1984 Virginia Slims World Championship Series schedule.

March

April

May

June

July

August

September

October

November

December

January 1985

February 1985

March 1985

Statistical Information

Titles won by player

These tables present the number of singles (S), doubles (D), and mixed doubles (X) titles won by each player and each nation during the season, within all the tournament categories of the 1984 Virginia Slims World Championship Series: the Grand Slam tournaments, the Year-end championships and regular events. The players/nations are sorted by:

 total number of titles (a doubles title won by two players representing the same nation counts as only one win for the nation);
 highest amount of highest category tournaments (for example, having a single Grand Slam gives preference over any kind of combination without a Grand Slam title); 
 a singles > doubles > mixed doubles hierarchy; 
 alphabetical order (by family names for players).

Titles won by nation

The following players won their first title in singles (S), doubles (D) or mixed doubles (X):

 Jenny Klitch – Nashville (S)
 Sherry Acker – Nashville (D)
 Catarina Lindqvist – Pennsylvania (S)
 Marcela Skuherská – Pennsylvania (D)
 Bonnie Gadusek – Marco Island (S)
 Helena Suková – Marco Island (D)
 Andrea Leand – Pittsburgh (S), Zurich (D)
 JoAnne Russell – Indianapolis (S)
 Sandra Cecchini – Taranto (S)
 Sabrina Goleš – Taranto (D)
 Petra Huber – Taranto (D)
 Iva Budařová – Perugia (D)
 Manuela Maleeva – Lugano (S)
 Hélène Pelletier – Rio de Janeiro (D)
 Jill Hetherington – Rio de Janeiro (D)
 Anna-Maria Fernandez – Newport (D)
 Debbie Spence – San Diego (S)
 Michelle Casati – Tampa (S)
 Lilian Drescher – Japan Open (S)
 Zina Garrison – Zurich (S)
 Anne Minter – Salt Lake City (D)
 Elizabeth Minter – Salt Lake City (D)
 Mercedes Paz – Borden Classic (D)
 Ronni Reis – Borden Classic (D)
 Carling Bassett – Tampa (D)
 Andrea Temesvári – Zurich (D)

The following players mounted a successful title defence in singles (S), doubles (D) or mixed doubles (X):
 Martina Navratilova – Orlando (S), VS Masters (S,D), Eastbourne (S, D), Wimbledon (S,D), US Open (S,D), Australian Open (D)
 Candy Reynolds – Nashville (D)
 Christiane Jolissaint – Lugano (D)
 Marcella Mesker – Lugano (D)
 Anne Hobbs – Berlin (D)
 Pam Shriver – VS Masters (D), Eastbourne (D), Wimbledon (D), US Open (D), Australian Open (D)
 Yvonne Vermaak – Salt Lake City (S)
 Wendy Turnbull – Wimbledon (X)

Rankings

Singles

Awards
The winners of the 1984 WTA Awards were announced in 1985.

Player of the Year: Martina Navratilova
Doubles Team of the Year: Martina Navratilova & Pam Shriver
Most Improved Player: Kathy Jordan
Newcomer of the Year: Manuela Maleeva
Player Service: Kim Shaefer
Karen Krantzcke Sportsmanship Award: Marcella Mesker

Retirements
The following notable players announced their retirement from women's tennis in 1984:
 Florența Mihai
 Sue Barker

See also
 1984 Volvo Grand Prix – men's circuit
 Women's Tennis Association
 International Tennis Federation

References

External links
 Official WTA Tour website

 
Virginia Slims World Championship Series
1984 WTA Tour